Neomi Aharoni-Gal (born: September 7, 1998), known by her stage name Nunu, is an Israeli singer and performer.

Biography 
Aharoni-Gal was born and raised in the Kerem Ha Teimanim neighborhood in Tel Aviv, Israel to Michal and Doron Aharoni. When she was younger, she attended Herzliya Hebrew Gymnasium and Highschool Alef of Arts in Tel Aviv. She was drafted into the IDF as an acclaimed Jazz singer  to a course that combines studies for honorary music students at Rimon Music School along with army service in a military band.

Career 
On June 21, 2021, Nunu released her first single "Banim" (Boys). Half a year later, on December 7th, she released her single "Living the Dream".

On January 12, 2022, Nunu released a cover version to the song "Adoni" along with Roni Duani. On May 10th of that year she and Duani opened for Maroon 5's second performance at Hayarkon Park in Tel Aviv. A few days later, she released her her single "Shuz".

On June 6, 2022, Nunu released her single "Cute Boy" in honor of Pride Month in collaboration with the LGBT party line "Forever".

On July 18, 2022, Nunu released her debut album "Status".

Discography

Studio albums 
 2022: Status

Mini-albums 
 2022: Nunu Rmx - EP

 2022: Live Performances at Mifal HaPais - EP

Singles

Filmography

Music videos

References

External links 

1998 births
Living people
21st-century Israeli women singers
Israeli pop singers